Berty may refer to:
 Berty Albrecht (1893-1943), French Resistance fighter
 Berty Premalal Dissanayake (1954–2013), Sri Lankan politician 
 Louis Berty Ayock (b. 1983), Cameroonian footballer
 Maurice Berty (1884–1946), French illustrator

See also
 Berti
 Bertie (disambiguation)